Jacoba Langgaard (born 24 September 1988) is a Faroese football who plays as a midfielder for B36 Tórshavn and the Faroe Islands women's national football team. In 2020, she was named the Faroese National Team Player of the Year.

In 2021, she signed with B36.

References

External links

Faroe statistics at faroesoccer.com

1988 births
Living people
Faroese women's footballers
Faroe Islands women's international footballers
Women's association football midfielders